Polly of the Circus is a 1932 American pre-Code MGM drama film directed by Alfred Santell and starring Marion Davies and Clark Gable.

Plot
When a traveling circus arrives in a small town, trapeze artist Polly Fisher (Marion Davies) is outraged to find that clothing has been added to posters of her to hide her moderately skimpy costume. She goes to see the man she mistakenly holds responsible, Reverend John Hartley (Clark Gable). He denies being the censor, but their relationship gets off to a rocky start.

When a heckler distracts Polly during her performance, she falls  to the ground. John Hartley has her brought to his nearby house. The doctor advises against moving her. As she recuperates, Polly and John fall in love and marry. She willingly gives up the circus for him.

John's uncle, Bishop James Northcott (C. Aubrey Smith), questions the wisdom of the union, and John's congregation rebels at having an ex-circus performer as their minister's wife. As a result, he is fired and cannot obtain another church position because of his marriage.

Seeing how miserable her husband is, Polly goes to plead for the bishop's help, but he remains unmoved. When she tells Northcott she is willing to give John up, the clergyman tells her that a divorced minister is just as unacceptable. Polly sees only one way out - as a widower, John could return to the church. She pretends that she has tired of her husband and returns to the circus, planning to have a fatal "accident". However, Northcott has a change of heart. When he goes to tell the couple, Polly has already left. Northcott guesses what she intends to do. He and John speed to the circus' next stop and arrive just in time to save Polly.

Cast
 Marion Davies as Pauline 'Polly' Fisher
 Clark Gable as Reverend John Hartley
 C. Aubrey Smith as Bishop James Northcott
 Raymond Hatton as Downey, Hartley's servant
 David Landau as Beef, the circus manager who raised Polly
 Ruth Selwyn as Mitzi
 Maude Eburne as Mrs. Jennings
 "Little Billy" Rhodes as Half-Pint
 Guinn Williams as Eric Alvarez
 Clark Marshall as Don Alvarez
 Lillian Elliott as Mrs. McNamara, a friend of the Hartleys
 Ray Milland as Church Usher (uncredited)

Sources
The story started as a short novel by Margaret Mayo which she then adapted as a script for a 1907 play, Polly of the Circus, written for the entertainment magnet Frederic Thompson. The play, complete with a live circus and other spectacles on stage designed by Thompson, was Broadway success and eventually had several productions playing in cities around the country.

First film adaptation of the play
A silent film version of the Margaret Mayo play was made in 1917, the first film by Goldwyn Pictures. It was shot in Fort Lee, New Jersey at Universal Studios when it and many other early film studios in America's first motion picture industry were based there at the beginning of the 20th century.

Box office
According to MGM records, the film earned $530,000 in the US and Canada and $170,000 elsewhere resulting in a profit of $20,000.

References

External links
 
 
 
 

1932 films
1932 romantic drama films
American black-and-white films
American romantic drama films
Circus films
1930s English-language films
American films based on plays
Films directed by Alfred Santell
Metro-Goldwyn-Mayer films
1930s American films